"Out of Reach" is a song by English singer Gabrielle. It was written by Gabrielle and frequent collaborator Jonathan Shorten for the soundtrack of Sharon Maguire's 2001 romantic comedy film Bridget Jones's Diary. The London Session Orchestra provides the string instruments on the track.

Released as the soundtrack's lead single on 9 April 2001, "Out of Reach" peaked at number one in Portugal, number two in New Zealand, and number four on the UK Singles Chart. As of March 2021, the song had sold 645,000 copies in the UK as stated by the Official Charts Company, and became the 10th-most-successful single of 2001 in New Zealand. It was later included in the 2001 reissue of her Rise album as well as her greatest hits compilation Dreams Can Come True, Greatest Hits Vol. 1, released the same year.

Music video
The official music video features Gabrielle singing the song whilst wearing dark sunglasses and a large black leather jacket, intercut with clips from Bridget Jones's Diary. The video also featured Don Gilet.

Track listings

Credits and personnel
Credits are adapted from the UK CD single liner notes.

Studios
 Recorded at Mayfair Studios and Metropolis Studios (London)
 Mixed at Sarm West Studios (London)

Personnel

 Gabrielle – writing, lead vocals
 Jonathan Shorten – writing, keyboard, production
 Maria Lawson – backing vocals
 Marion Powell – backing vocals
 Paul Noble – guitar

 Derrick Taylor – bass guitar
 Dylan Howe – drums
 London Session Orchestra – strings
 Jason Hazeley – string arrangement
 John Brough – engineering

Charts and certifications

Weekly charts

Year-end charts

Certifications

Release history

References

2001 singles
2001 songs
Bridget Jones
Gabrielle (singer) songs
Go! Beat singles
Number-one singles in Portugal
Songs written by Gabrielle (singer)
Songs written by Jonathan Shorten
Songs written for films
Universal Records singles